Budyonny is a rural locality (a khutor) in Chernorechenskoye Rural Settlement, Kikvidzensky District, Volgograd Oblast, Russia. The population was 169 as of 2010. There are 3 streets.

Geography 
Budyonny is located 26 km southeast of Preobrazhenskaya (the district's administrative centre) by road. Chernolagutinsky is the nearest rural locality.

References 

Rural localities in Kikvidzensky District